Fraternity Vacation is a 1985 American sex comedy teen movie starring Stephen Geoffreys as a nerdy pledge to the Theta Pi Gamma fraternity at Iowa State, with Tim Robbins and Cameron Dye as Theta Pi Gamma frat boys (or, as they are known to their Iowa State frat rivals, "Theta Pigs").  On spring break in Palm Springs, California, several boys  compete for the affections of a sophisticated co-ed, played by Sheree J. Wilson.

Plot

Despite being saddled with a nerdy pledge during a Palm Springs weekend, two frat brothers vie for a poolside blonde.

Cast
 Stephen Geoffreys as Wendell Tvedt
 Sheree J. Wilson as Ashley Taylor
 Cameron Dye as Joe Gillespie
 Leigh McCloskey as Charles 'Chas' Lawlor III
 Tim Robbins as Larry 'Mother' Tucker
 Matt McCoy as J.C. Springer
 Amanda Bearse as Nicole Ferret
 John Vernon as Chief Ferret
 Nita Talbot as Mrs. Ferret
 Barbara Crampton as Chrissie
 Kathleen Kinmont as Marianne
 Max Wright as Millard Tvedt
 Julie Payne as Naomi Tvedt
 Franklin Ajaye as Harry
 Charles Rocket as 'Madman' Mac
 Britt Ekland as Eyvette

Reception
Fraternity Vacation was not a major success at the box office, earning just over $3 million. Critical reception for the film was also predominantly unfavorable. Roger Ebert gave the film one star out of four:

Don't get me wrong. I have nothing against dumb sex comedies. All I object to is the fact that "Fraternity Vacation" is playing with half a deck—the male half. The men are the characters and the women are the objects.

Gene Siskel gave the film zero stars, calling it "yet another dimwitted college sex comedy, a film that doesn't have a single redeeming facet." Janet Maslin of The New York Times wrote, "The material is more smirky than funny, and the cast isn't particularly likable." Variety wrote, "Neither wildly gross nor unbearably funny, pic nevertheless maintains a cheerful attitude throughout as the single minded teenage characters pursue the opposite sex with all the subtlety of dogs checking each other out." Michael Wilmington of the Los Angeles Times thought that the film did have a "bright cast" and "skillfully brisk direction," but was defeated by a script "devoid of surprises and ideas—and often characters." A review in The Tech (MIT) said that the film was a poor example of its genre, and "not worth seeing unless you're really in the mood for this type of movie".

References

External links

 

1985 films
1980s sex comedy films
American sex comedy films
Films shot in California
Films set in Palm Springs, California
New World Pictures films
Films about fraternities and sororities
Films directed by James Frawley
Films scored by Brad Fiedel
Teen sex comedy films
1985 comedy films
1980s English-language films
1980s American films